The 1993 World Games were held in The Hague, Netherlands, from July 22 to August 2, 1993.

Acrobatic gymnastics

Artistic roller skating

Beach volleyball

Bodybuilding

Bowling

Casting

Field archery

Finswimming

Fistball

Inline speed skating

Karate

Korfball

Lifesaving

Netball

Pétanque

Powerlifting

Racquetball

Roller hockey

Sambo

Taekwondo

Trampoline gymnastics

Triathlon

Tug of war

Water skiing

References

External links
 International World Games Association

Medalists
1993